Gooding may refer to:

Places
 Gooding County, Idaho, a county in the United States
 Gooding, Colorado, an unincorporated community in the United States
 Gooding, Idaho, a city in the United States
 Gooding High School, located within the city
 Goodings Grove, Illinois, a census-designated place in the United States
 Gooding Drive, a road in Australia

Other uses
 Gooding (surname), an English surname
 Gooding (band), an American rock band
 Gooding railway station, in Australia
 Gooding, an old English custom of asking for money during the Feast of St. Thomas

See also
 Gooding & Company, an American car auction company
 Goodings (surname)